Tales from the Green Valley is a British historical documentary TV series in 12 parts, first shown on BBC Two from 19 August to 4 November 2005. The series, the first in the historic farm series, made for the BBC by independent production company Lion TV, follows historians and archaeologists as they recreate farm life from the age of the Stuarts; they wear the clothes, eat the food and use the tools, skills and technology of the 1620s.

The series recreates everyday life on a small farm in Gray Hill, Monmouthshire, Wales, in the period, using authentic replica equipment and clothing, original recipes and reconstructed building techniques. Much use is made of period sources such as agricultural writers Gervase Markham and Thomas Tusser.

The series was written, directed and produced by British archaeologist and documentary maker, Peter Sommer, who was awarded the Learning on Screen Award in 2006 by the British Universities Film & Video Council, for Tales from the Green Valley.

The series features historians Stuart Peachey and Ruth Goodman, and archaeologists Alex Langlands, Peter Ginn and saddler Chloe Spencer.

The series was released on DVD, distributed by Acorn Media UK. An associated book by Stuart Peachey – The Building of the Green Valley: A Reconstruction of an Early 17th-century Rural Landscape – was published in 2006.

The sequel to this series is Victorian Farm, with Goodman, Langlands and Ginn returning as TV hosts.

Episodes

Sequels
A Tudor Feast at Christmas – a "spin-off" from the series, broadcast on 21 December 2006, produced and directed by Chris Mitchell for Lion Television – showed the team recreating a Tudor banquet at Haddon Hall with experts Marc Meltonville and Hugh Beamish.

A new series set in the 19th century, Victorian Farm, was screened on BBC Two in January 2009 and was followed by Edwardian Farm in November 2010. A series set during the Second World War, titled Wartime Farm, followed in September 2012, with Tudor Monastery Farm then premièring in November 2013.

References

External links
 

Tales from the Green Valley on Peter Sommers Travel website
Full list of all 12 episodes
BBC News Magazine: "Lessons from our ancestors about the countryside"
Grayhill Farm website
Ruth Goodman website
Alex Langlands website

2005 British television series debuts
2005 British television series endings
Renaissance reenactment
English-language television shows
Historical reality television series
Television series by All3Media
BBC historic farm series
BBC television documentaries about history during the 16th and 17th centuries
Television shows about agriculture